Mileh Khan (also Romanized as Mīleh Khān, Meleh Khān, and Milleh Khān) is a village in Mirbag-e Jonubi Rural District, in the Central District of Delfan County, Lorestan Province, Iran. At the 2006 census, its population was 794, in 181 families.

References 

Towns and villages in Delfan County